Humble Hearts School, Kenya's first bilingual school for the deaf using Kenyan Sign Language (KSL) and English on an equal basis, was started by Beatrice Anunda on 9 September 2003.

Anunda was taught Kenyan Sign Language in the University of Nairobi's KSL Research Project, and came across a nine-year-old deaf child called Melinda in Doonholm. Anunda decided to start a project to reach out to deaf children who could not access schooling. The school began to admit hearing siblings, and then other hearing children in the area of the school were admitted to Humble Hearts to promote inclusion. By the end of 2006, there were 300 students. In addition, KSL classes were offered to parents and others in the local community.

The school is based in Sinai (Paradise), a large slum by Doonholm, a middle-class suburb of Nairobi. In 2009, the school was destroyed when the Kenya Pipeline Company cleared land that was the right-of-way for an underground oil pipeline that ran through the settlement. The school met in temporary classrooms until the school was rebuilt in a new location with the help of philanthropists and volunteers. In 2016, work continued towards improving the school building for 300 students including 125 boarders. The students were provided with e-readers.

Humble Hearts has a sister school, Trillium Charter School, located in Portland, Oregon, United States.

See also

 Deaf education in Kenya
 List of schools for the deaf
 List of schools in Kenya

References

2003 establishments in Kenya
Bilingual schools
Educational institutions established in 2003
Schools for the deaf in Kenya
Schools in Nairobi